The Midlands Partnership NHS Foundation Trust was created in June 2018 by a merger of Staffordshire and Stoke-on-Trent Partnership NHS Trust and the South Staffordshire and Shropshire Healthcare NHS Foundation Trust.  It provides physical and mental health, learning disabilities and adult social care services.

It forecast an annual turnover of more than £500 million.  No more than 40 redundancies among the 8,500 staff were expected because of the merger.

It uses Nasstar’s OneConsultation platform for secure online consultations.  This was installed across the trust in March 2020 hurriedly because of the COVID-19 pandemic in England. More than 80,000 online consultations had taken place by February 2022.

References

Health in Staffordshire
NHS foundation trusts
Health in Shropshire